Puerto Rico competed at the 1994 Winter Olympics in Lillehammer, Norway.

Competitors
The following is the list of number of competitors in the Games.

Bobsleigh

References

Sources
Official Olympic Reports

Nations at the 1994 Winter Olympics
1994 Winter Olympics
1994 in Puerto Rican sports